Santa Rosa is a corregimiento in Bugaba District, Chiriquí Province, Panama. Its population as of 1990 was 1,337; its population as of 2000 was 1,407.

References

Corregimientos of Chiriquí Province